

List

God does not pay every Saturday.
When the sun shines on me I think but little of the moon.
Tell the truth and make thyself scarce.
The just man laughs and the guilty hides himself.
No trade without tools.
Where right is of no use wrong will not avail.
Who does not keep a cat keeps mice.
No resolution without discussion.
The miser ends by giving more, and the lazy man by going further.
What is play to horses is death to donkeys.

References

Citations

Sources 

  (Public Domain)

External links

Serbian language